Standings and results for Group C of the Regular Season phase of the 2006-07 Euroleague basketball tournament.

Tiebreakers:
Head-to-head record in matches between the tied clubs
Overall point difference in games between the tied clubs
Overall point difference in all group matches (first tiebreaker if tied clubs are not in the same group)
Points scored in all group matches
Sum of quotients of points scored and points allowed in each group match

Standings

Notes:
Aris win the fifth-place tiebreaker over Eldo; the clubs split their games, but Aris scored 6 more head-to-head points than Eldo.
Eldo lost the tiebreaker with Partizan in Group B for the best sixth-place record, as Partizan had an overall points difference in group play of +7 to Eldo's -61.

Fixtures and results
* = Overtime (one star per overtime period)

Game 1, October 25–26, 2006

Game 2, November 1–2, 2006

Game 3, November 8–9, 2006

Game 4, November 15–16, 2006

Game 5, November 22–23, 2006

Game 6, November 29–30, 2006

Game 7, December 6–7, 2006

Game 8, December 13–14, 2006

Game 9, December 20–21, 2006

Game 10, January 3–4, 2007

Game 11, January 10–11, 2007

Game 12, January 17–18, 2007

Game 13, January 24–25, 2007

Game 14, January 31 - February 1, 2007

Notes and references

Group C
2006–07 in Spanish basketball
2006–07 in Russian basketball
2006–07 in Lithuanian basketball
2006–07 in Greek basketball
2006–07 in Italian basketball
2006–07 in Turkish basketball
2006–07 in French basketball